The Canada national hockey team may refer to:

Canada men's national ball hockey team
Canada women's national ball hockey team
Canada men's national field hockey team
Canada women's national field hockey team
Canada national ringette team
Canada men's national ice hockey team
 Canada men's national junior ice hockey team
 Canada men's national under-18 ice hockey team
Canada women's national ice hockey team
 Canada women's national under-18 ice hockey team
Canada men's national ice sledge hockey team
Canada women's national ice sledge hockey team
Canada men's national inline hockey team
Canada women's national inline hockey team